Boat racing is a sport in which boats, or other types of watercraft, race on water.  Boat racing powered by oars is recorded as having occurred in ancient Egypt, and it is likely that people have engaged in races involving boats and other water-borne craft for as long as such watercraft have existed.

A regatta is a series of boat races.  The term comes from the Venetian language, with regata meaning "contest" and typically describes racing events of rowed or sailed water craft, although some powerboat race series are also called regattas. A regatta often includes social and promotional activities which surround the  racing event, and except in the case of boat type (or "class") championships, is usually named for the town or venue where the event takes place.

Although regattas are typically amateur competitions, they are usually formally structured events, with comprehensive rules describing the schedule and procedures of the event. Regattas may be organized as championships for a particular area or type of boat, but are often held just for the joy of competition, camaraderie, and general promotion of the sport.

One of the largest and most popular rowing regattas is the Henley Royal Regatta held on the River Thames, England. One of the largest and oldest yachting regattas in the world is Cowes Week, which is held annually by the Royal Yacht Squadron in Cowes, England, and usually attracts over 900 sailing boats. Cowes Week is predated by the Cumberland Cup (1775), Port of Dartmouth Royal Regatta (1822) and Port of Plymouth Regatta (1823). North America's oldest regatta is the Royal St. John's Regatta held on Quidi Vidi Lake in St. John's, Newfoundland every year since 1818.

The term "regatta" is from Venetian regata ("contention for mastery"), from regatare ("compete, haggle, sell at retail"), possibly from recatare.

There exist other traditional and centuries old boat races like Vallam kali of Kerala, India and Dragon Boat Race from China.

Rowing

World Rowing Federation championship events 

 World Rowing Cup
 World Rowing Championships
 World Rowing Junior Championships
 World Rowing Under 23 Championships
 European Rowing Championships

North America

United States 

 American Henley Regatta, first world championships in the United States
 Dad Vail Regatta, Philadelphia, Pennsylvania, championships for college clubs
The Harvard–Yale Regatta – also known as 'The Race'
 Head of the Charles Regatta, on the Charles River between Boston and Cambridge, Massachusetts
 Head of the Hooch, on the Tennessee River in Chattanooga, Tennessee
 Intercollegiate Rowing Association National Championships, college championships for men and lightweight women
 Marathon Rowing Championship a continuous  rowing regatta on Cane River Lake in Natchitoches, Louisiana
 New England Interscholastic Rowing Association Championships
 Poughkeepsie Regatta was an historical regatta that hosted the IRA National Championship from 1895 until 1949.
 Scholastic Rowing Association of America Championships
 USRowing National Championships
The Windermere Cup - between the University of Washington and one or several challengers of their choice

Canada 

 The Brentwood Regatta is held in the spring and is one of the largest high school rowing regattas on the west coast of North America.
 Royal Canadian Henley Regatta, in St. Catharines, Ontario, Canada, in the first week of August is one of the largest annual regattas in North America, attracting hundreds of clubs in 128 junior, senior, and master's events.
 Royal St. John's Regatta, held every year on Quidi Vidi Lake in St. John's, Newfoundland, North America's oldest annual sporting events.

Europe

United Kingdom 

 Regattas on the River Thames lists all Thames rowing regattas and other rowing events
 The Boat Race is a rowing race between the Oxford University Boat Club and the Cambridge University Boat Club. It is rowed annually each Spring on the Thames in London.
 Henley Royal Regatta, held every year on the River Thames is one of several prestigious British events
 Lent and May Bumps, the two main intercollegiate bumps races of the University of Cambridge, held on the Cam.
 The National Schools Regatta is the largest regatta for junior rowers in Great Britain
 The Boat Race of the North – between the University of Durham and the University of Newcastle
 Port of Dartmouth Royal Regatta, held annually at the end of August on the River Dart.
 Summer Eights, along with Torpids, the two intercollegiate bumps races of Oxford University, held on the Isis in Oxford.
 The Welsh Boat Race is a rowing race between the Swansea University Rowing Club and the Cardiff University Boat Club. It is rowed annually each Spring on the Taff River or the River Tawe in South Wales.
 The City of Exeter Rowing Regatta, the oldest rowing regatta in the South West, is held annually in Exeter in July.

Continental Europe 

 Regata delle Antiche Repubbliche Marinare, Italy
 The Croco's Cup, international rowing regatta at University level held every year in Paris since 1985, organised by students of ENSTA (Paristech).
 Tour du Lac, around the lake Geneva is the 160 km (99 mi) the longest non-stop rowing regatta in the world.
 Vienna Nightrow is an international sprint rowing regatta for coxed eights in Austria at night.
 Maltese National Regatta, held bi-annually on 31 March and 8 September in the Grand Harbour, Valletta
Dragon boat racing – a type of human-powered watercraft racing, originating from oriental Asia
Canoe racing – competitive forms of canoeing and kayaking
Kayak racing
Outrigger canoe racing

Sailing 
Sailing race events are typically held for a single one design class and usually last more than one day. Regattas may be hosted by a yacht club, sailing association, town or school as in the case of the UK's National School Sailing Association and Interscholastic Sailing Association (high school) regattas or Intercollegiate Sailing Association (college) regattas.

The Barcolana regatta of the yacht club Società Velica di Barcola e Grignano is currently the Guinness world record holder as the "largest sailing race" with 2,689 boats and over 16,000 sailors at the starting line. Currently, The Three Bridge Fiasco, conducted by the Singlehanded Sailing Society of San Francisco Bay with more than 350 competitors is the largest sailboat race in the United States.

Types 
Yacht racing – the sport of competitive yachting
Team racing – also known as teams racing, is a popular form of yacht racing

Oldest sailing regattas 

 1775 – Cumberland Cup, organised by the Royal Thames Yacht Club, UK
 1777 – Lough Ree Regatta, organised by Athlone Yacht Club, Ireland.
 1792 – Whitstable Regatta UK
 1822 – Port of Dartmouth Royal Regatta, Dartmouth, UK
 1823 – Port of Plymouth Regatta, Plymouth, UK
 1826 – Cowes Week, Isle of Wight, UK
 1828 – Kingstown Regatta, (now renamed Dun Laoghaire), Ireland
 1828 – Royal Harwich Regatta, Harwich, UK
 1834 – Lough Derg Regatta, at Killaloe, Williamstown and Drumineer, Ireland.
 1837 – Sydney Australia Day Regatta, held every year since 1837, the longest running without a break
 1838 – Royal Hobart Regatta, Australia
 1840 – Auckland Anniversary Regatta, New Zealand
 1844 – Royal Geelong Regatta / Audi Victoria Week, Royal Geelong Yacht Club, Australia
 1845 – New York Yacht Club Regatta, United States
 1849 – Pass Christian Regatta Club on July 21, 1849; twelve boats participated. First regatta on the U.S. Gulf Coast
 1849 – Sandy Bay Australia Day Regatta Australia
 1850 – Race to the Coast, Southern Yacht Club Regatta. Oldest continuously running regatta in the Western Hemisphere United States
 1851 – America's Cup, usually competed for in the country of the current defender/holder
 1851 – Port Esperance Regatta, Australia
 1856 – Chester Race Week, Nova Scotia, Canada
 1857 – Gorey Regatta, Jersey, Channel Islands
 1882 – Kiel Week, Kiel, Germany
 1885 – Appledore & Instow Regatta, North Devon, UK
 1886 – Torbay Royal Regatta, Torbay, UK
 1894 – Britannia Boating Club, Ottawa, Ontario, Canada

Current sailing regattas 

 Aegean Rally, Aegean Sea, Greece
 America's Cup, hosted by prior winner
 The Athlone Yacht Club Regatta on Lough Ree, Ireland
 Appledore & Instow Regatta – founded in 1885, tracing its origins back to 1831, is held annually on the River Torridge between the Villages of Appledore & Instow North Devon, UK.
 Auckland Anniversary Regatta held annually on the Waitemata Harbour to celebrate Auckland Anniversary Day
 Balaton Regatta, held every year on the Lake Balaton between the teams of Veszprém Campus and Keszthely Campus of University of Pannonia
 Balmain Regatta held annually on Sydney Harbour, Australia
 Barcolana Autumn Cup Regatta, one of the largest single start sailing regattas in the world, held annually on the second Sunday of October in Trieste, Italy
 Bass Week, Bassenthwaite Lake, Cumbria
 Bay Week, Put-in-Bay, Ohio
 Block Island Race Week, Rhode Island
 Canada's Cup, held periodically on the Great Lakes.
 Canadian Olympic-training Regatta, Kingston (CORK) held annually in August in Kingston, Ontario Canada.
 Carriacou Regatta Festival, Hillsborough, Carriacou, Grenada. W.I. - First weekend in August each year.
 CASON Grand Prize Solo Regatta, Lake Balaton, Hungary, held annually in September.
 Charleston Race Week, Charleston, South Carolina, held each April for three days, with races staged both in Charleston Harbor and offshore.
 Chester Race Week, Chester, Nova Scotia, Canada, 15 keelboat fleets race for 4 full days on 5 courses in mid-August on beautiful Mahone Bay
 Chicago Yacht Club Race to Mackinac, held annually in July, starting in Chicago on Lake Michigan and ending at Mackinac Island on Lake Huron.
 Columbus Day Regatta, Miami, Florida, annually in October.
 Chichester-Cowes Challenge, held annually at the end of June on the Solent, and welcomes only classic wooden boats, mainly built in the 1920s–1930s.
The Clipper Round the World Yacht Race
 Cork Week, Cork, Ireland. Hosted by the Royal Cork Yacht Club bi-annually.
 Cowes Week, Royal Yacht Squadron, England
 Dun Laoghaire Regatta, Ireland, combined Dun Laoghaire Yacht Clubs, held Biannually.
 Færderseilasen, Royal Norwegian Yacht Club (KNS), from Oslo to Horten via Færder lighthouse.
The Fastnet Race
 Figawi Race, Hyannis, Massachusetts
 Fowey Royal Regatta, Fowey Cornwall annually in August
 Hangon Regatta, an annual event in the city of Hanko, Finland, infamous for attracting large groups of partying youths with a tangential interest in the sailing itself
 Harvest Moon Regatta, Lakewood Yacht Club in Seabrook Texas hosts cruisers regatta during full moon in October each year from Galveston to Port Aransas
 Kamer 2 Sailing Marathon, Kaag, Netherlands, annually in September
 Key West Race Week, Key West, Florida
 Kékszalag, Balatonfüred, Hungary annually in July
 Kiel Week, Kiel/Germany - the largest sailing event in the world
 Lake Ontario 300, Port Credit, Ontario - the longest fresh-water sailboat race in the world, held annually in July
 Larchmont Race Week, Larchmont Yacht Club, New York
 Lighthouse Regatta, Lake Hefner hosted by the Oklahoma City Boat Club
 Long Beach Race Week, Long Beach, California
 Louis Vuitton Trophy, a world series of regattas, multiple locations
 Lysekil Women's Match, Lysekil, Sweden, annually in August
 Mardi Gras Race Week, New Orleans Yacht Club, large One Design regatta held on Lake Pontchartrain
 MidsummerSail, annual sailing regatta from the southernmost to the northernmost point of the Baltic Sea
 Monsoon regatta Monsoon Regatta India
 Mrduja Regatta, an annual regatta held in the city of Split, Croatia
 National Offshore One Design (NOOD)
 New World Regatta, held every year between the ports of Koper, Slovenia and Baltimore, Maryland.
 Port Huron to Mackinac Boat Race, Mighigan
 Port of Dartmouth Royal Regatta, held annually at the end of August over three days on the River Dart.
 Race to the Coast, Southern Yacht Club, New Orleans, Louisiana to Gulfport, Mississippi
 Regatta Vava'u held annually in Vava'u, Kingdom of Tonga in September
 Rotary Club of Sydney Cove Charity Regatta held annually since 1995 on the second Friday of November at the Cruising Yacht Club of Australia
 Round Texel, Texel, Netherlands, annually in June
 Sail Melbourne, Held annually on Melbourne's Port Phillip Bay
 Sawadee.com Regatta Samui, Thailand, Annually on the island of Koh Samui, Thailand in June
 Sint Maarten Classic Yacht Regatta, Sint Maarten, held last weekend of March
 Sint Maarten Heineken Regatta, Sint Maarten, annually in March
 Sugar Bowl Regatta, New Orleans Yacht Club, New Orleans, Louisiana
 Tall Ships Race
 Tjörn Runt, Tjörn, Sweden, annually in August
 Travemünde Week, Travemünde, Germany, annually in July
 United Sailing Week, Croatia. The biggest sailing regatta and yachting event in Croatia. 50 boats in 4 classes and 500 participants.
The Velux 5 Oceans Race – a round-the-world, staged, single-handed yacht race; originally known as the 'BOC Challenge', and then the 'Around Alone'
The Vendee Globe – a round-the-world, non-stop, single-handed yacht race
 Vintage Yachting Games, each time in another country first in 2008, Medemblik, The Netherlands since then every four years. 2012 Lake Como Italy
 Voiles de Saint-Tropez, Saint-Tropez, France, annually in October
The Volvo Ocean Race
 Washington's Birthday Regatta, at the Barnacle Historic State Park, Coconut Grove, Florida, annually in February
 West Highland Yachting Week, Oban, W Coast Scotland
 Whale of a Sail, Carlyle Sailing Association, Carlyle, IL
 Whiskeytown Regatta, Whiskeytown Lake—Redding, CA
 Youngstown Levels, Youngstown, New York
 Chichester Biarritz Challenge, Chichester, England, to Biarritz, France, annually in April.

School sailing regattas 

 Mallory Cup, United States high school sailing national championships.
 Nixor College, the first college in Pakistan to launch a 'RAFT' regatta for team building.
 Royal College Colombo and S. Thomas' College, Mt. Lavinia, Oldest Regatta in Sri Lanka. (Royal Thomian Regatta)
 Sywoc, the Student Yachting World Cup organized by the students of the École Polytechnique.
 The NSSA National Youth Regatta is the largest dinghy sailing regatta and the largest youth sailing regatta in the UK. Due to its size the NYR visits a new location each year alternating between coastal and inland venues. Previous years venues include Bridlington (North Yorkshire), Datchet Sailing Club (West London) Plymouth (Devon), Redcar (North East England), Deal (Kent), Grafham Water (Cambridgeshire), Weymouth (Dorset) to name just a few.

University / college sailing regattas 

 Charleston Open, College of Charleston
 Fisher Hall Regatta, University of Notre Dame
 Intercollegiate Sailing Association National Championships, various locations
 Kennedy Cup, US Naval Academy
 The Roth Regatta, Roth Pond, State University of New York at Stony Brook
 The Regent Regatta, Regent Pond, Regent University
 The CoEP Regatta, Mula River, College of Engineering, Pune - Held annually in March (since 1928), one of the oldest and most celebrated regattas in India
 Mustang Open Regatta, Cal Poly San Luis Obispo

Motorboat racing

24 Heures Motonautiques de Rouen – a 24-hour circuit boat race in Rouen, France
Archer eade memorial – an unlimited outboard race consisting of six laps
Inshore powerboat racing – and within this category, the F1 Powerboat World Championship
Offshore powerboat racing – racing by large, specially designed ocean-going powerboats promoted by Offshore Racing Organization
XCAT Racing – a sport involving Extreme Catamarans or XCATs; XCAT Racing is promoted by the World Professional Powerboating Association (WPPA) and governed by the Union Internationale Motonautique (UIM)
Drag boat racing – a form of drag racing which takes place on water rather than land
Hydroplane racing – a sport involving racing hydroplanes on lakes and rivers
Jet sprint boat racing
Swamp buggy racing – although not technically classed as boats, these specialist craft race tri-annually on swampy area circuits in the Florida region
Bathtub racing

Other notable regattas and boat races 

 Stuart Sailfish Regatta, Stuart, FL. Boat classes; Jersey Skiffs, Inboard and outboard Hydroplanes, Grand Prix Series
 Beer Can Regatta, boats made from aluminium cans in Darwin, NT, Australia.
 Madison Regatta, Madison, Indiana. (hydroplanes)
 Kingston Multi-Hull Regatta, Kingston, Ontario (multihull sailboats and sailing hydrofoils)
 Henley-on-Todd Regatta - an Australian dry-land event.
 Hidden Lake Regatta, Columbus, Ohio.   Sponsored in July each year by the Hidden Lake Yacht Club, featuring 8 non-motorized divisions.
Musi Triboatton – an annually occurring international boat race across more than 500 km of Musi River in South Sumatra, Indonesia
 Royal Hobart Regatta - a multiple event 3 day regatta in Tasmania, Australia.
The Nehru Trophy Boat Race – One of the traditional Snake Boat Races (Vallam kali) that takes place in Alleppey, Kerala, India
 Sy Barash Regatta - discontinued event at Penn State
 Worrell 1000, between South Beach and Virginia Beach, Virginia
 Toronto International Dragon Boat Race Festival, Toronto, Ontario
 Drina Regatta is the most visited tourist and recreation manifestation and the central event in the Western Serbia
 The 826LA Paddle Boat Regatta, Los Angeles, CA (paddle boats)

Race format types
Kyōtei – parimutuel boat racing in Japan, referred to as "BOAT RACE"
Match race – a race between two competitors, going head-to-head

See also
Boat race (disambiguation)
Rowing at the Summer Olympics and Sailing at the Summer Olympics, often collectively referred to as the Olympic Regatta.
Cowes Week
:Category:Yachting races

References

External links

XCAT Racing

 
Racing
Racing
 
 
 
Sailing (sport)
 
ja:ボートレース